Rise is the debut album by American musician Lane 8. It was released on July 17, 2015, by Anjunadeep.

Reception
Rise was generally well received by critics. Your EDM rated the album a 4 out of 5, with writer Cody Smith saying that "the tracks on Rise tap expertly into pop appeal without ever compromising the key tenets of house music," but noting that "The only danger apparent in Goldstein's adherence to Anjunadeep characteristics is that Rise may be too similar to other albums on the label." Jacqui Wonder of Acid Stag remarked that it was hard to determine "Lane 8's secret sauce to maintaining a cohesive sound as he produces such distinct tracks.

Track listing

References

2015 debut albums
Lane 8 albums
Anjunabeats albums